Landry Bonnefoi (born 20 September 1983) is a French professional footballer who plays as a goalkeeper.

Career
Born in Villeparisis, Bonnefoi was signed by Italian side Juventus from AS Cannes in 2001. Bonnefoi then spent two seasons initially playing for the Juventus youth team, although he was later promoted to the first team as the club's reserve goalkeeper behind Gianluigi Buffon and Antonio Chimenti, but did not make a single official appearance for the club. During the 2003–04 season, he was loaned to Messina, but only played one game for the Sicilian side. He was brought back to the club in 2004.

In 2006, wanting more appearances and feeling home sick, he was loaned to Ligue 2 team Metz, the team having an option to buy him permanently at the end of the season. In 2007, he moved to Dijon; he later played for Amiens between 2009 and 2012.

Following his club's relegation to the third division, Bonnefoi, on 31 July 2012 signed for the Corsican club SC Bastia.

Having been released by Strasbourg at the end of the 2016–17 he re-signed on a one-year contract in July 2017.

For the season 2018–19 Bonnefoi signed for F91 Dudelange in Luxembourg, and appeared in UEFA Europa League.

References

External links
 
 
 

1983 births
Living people
People from Villeparisis
Footballers from Seine-et-Marne
Association football goalkeepers
French footballers
French expatriate footballers
AS Cannes players
Juventus F.C. players
A.C.R. Messina players
FC Metz players
Dijon FCO players
Amiens SC players
SC Bastia players
LB Châteauroux players
RC Strasbourg Alsace players
F91 Dudelange players
Serie A players
Ligue 1 players
Ligue 2 players
Championnat National players
Expatriate footballers in Italy
France youth international footballers